This is a list of visual artists who are Native Americans in the United States. The Indian Arts and Crafts Act of 1990 defines "Native American" as being enrolled in either federally recognized tribes or state recognized tribes or "an individual certified as an Indian artisan by an Indian Tribe." This does not include non-Native American artists using Native American themes.  Additions to the list need to reference a recognized, documented source and specifically name tribal affiliation according to federal and state lists. Indigenous American artists outside the United States can be found at List of indigenous artists of the Americas.

Basket makers

 Elsie Allen, Cloverdale Pomo
 Annie Antone, Tohono O'odham
 Mary Knight Benson, Pomo, (1877–1930)
 William Ralganal Benson, Pomo, (1862–1937)
 Carrie Bethel, Mono Lake Paiute
 Susan Billy, Hopland Band Pomo
 Mary Holiday Black, Navajo (ca. 1934–2022)
 Loren Bommelyn, Smith River Tolowa
 Nellie Charlie, Mono Lake Paiute
 Chipeta, Uncompahgre Ute (c. 1843–1924)
 Kelly Church, Gun Lake Potawatomi
 Mike Dart, Cherokee Nation (born 1977)
 Lena Frank Dick, Washoe (ca. 1889 - 1965)
 Mavis Doering, Cherokee Nation (1929–2007)
 Joe Feddersen, Okanagan/Sinixt (born 1953)
 L. Frank, Tongva/Acjachemen
 Iva Honyestewa, Hopi (born 1964)
 Terrol Dew Johnson, Tohono O'odham
 Yvonne Walker Keshick, Anishinaabe (born 1946)
 Louisa Keyser (Dat So La Lee), Washoe (ca. 1829/1850–1925)
 Mary Leaf, Mohawk (1925–2004)
 Sarah Jim Mayo (1858–1918), Washoe
 Mabel McKay, Pomo/Patwin (1907–1993)
 Geo Soctomah Neptune, Passamaquoddy
 Julia Parker, Coast Miwok/Kashaya Pomo (born 1929)
 Essie Parrish, Kashaya Pomo (1902–1979)
 Christine Navarro Paul, Chitimacha, (1874-1946) 
 Sheila Kanieson Ransom (b. 1954) Akwesasne
 April Stone, Lake Superior Chippewa
 Boeda Strand, Snohomish
 Lucy Telles, Mono Lake Paiute/Miwok
 Gail Tremblay, Mi'kmaq/Onondaga descent

Beadwork and quillwork artists

 Tahnee Ahtoneharjo-Growingthunder, Kiowa/Muscogee/Seminole
 Richard Aitson, Kiowa/Kiowa Apache beadwork artist
 Marcus Amerman, Choctaw Nation of Oklahoma
 Imogene Goodshot Arquero, beadwork artist
 Martha Berry, Cherokee Nation
 Carla Hemlock, Mohawk
 Joyce Growing Thunder Fogarty, Assiniboine-Sioux
 Juanita Growing Thunder Fogarty, Assiniboine-Sioux
 Teri Greeves, Kiowa
 Vanessa Jennings, Kiowa/Kiowa Apache/Gila River Pima
 Maude Kegg, Mille Lacs Ojibwe (1904–1996)
 Yvonne Walker Keshick, Grand Traverse Ottawa-Ojibwe (born 1946)
 Katrina Mitten, Miami Tribe of Oklahoma beadwork artist
 Jamie Okuma, Luiseño/Shoshone-Bannock
 Emily Waheneka, Warm Springs/Wasco/Paiute (1919–2008)

Ceramic artists and potters

 Aguilar Family, Kewa Pueblo (Santo Domingo)
 Mrs. Ramos Aguilar, Kewa Pueblo (Santo Domingo)
 Tammie Allen (Walking Spirit), Jicarilla Apache
 Nathan Begaye, Navajo, Hopi
 Asuncion Aguilar Cate, Santo Domingo Pueblo
 Crucita Gonzales Calabaza (Blue Corn), San Ildefonso Pueblo
 Marie Chino, Acoma
 Vera Chino, Acoma
 Helen Quintana Cordero, Cochiti Pueblo
 Arthur and Hilda Coriz, Kewa Pueblo (Santo Domingo)
 Juanita Suazo Dubray, Taos Pueblo
 Anthony Durand, Picuris Pueblo
 Cora Durand, Picuris Pueblo (1902–1998)
 Felipita Aguilar Garcia, Santo Domingo Pueblo
 Tammy Garcia, Santa Clara Pueblo (born 1969)
 Bill Glass Jr., Cherokee Nation
 Rose Gonzales, Ohkay Owingeh Pueblo
 Luther Gutierrez, Santa Clara Pueblo (1911–1987)
 Margaret Gutierrez, Santa Clara Pueblo (born 1936)
 Laurencita Herrera, Cochiti Pueblo
 Daisy Hooee, Hopi-Tewa 
 Lisa Holt, Cochiti Pueblo
 Michael Kanteena, Laguna Pueblo
 Lucy M. Lewis, Acoma Pueblo
 Otellie Loloma, Hopi (1921–1993)
 Joseph Lonewolf, Santa Clara Pueblo (1932–2014)
 Julian Martinez, San Ildefonso Pueblo (1879–1943)
 Maria Montoya Martinez (Poveka), San Ildefonso Pueblo (1887–1980)
 Maria Ramita Martinez, Picuris Pueblo (1884–1969)
 Grace Medicine Flower, Santa Clara Pueblo
 Helen Naha ("Feather Woman"), Hopi (1922–1993)
 Tyra Naha, Hopi
 Priscilla Namingha Hopi-Tewa (1924–2008) 
 Nampeyo (Iris Nampeyo), Hopi-Tewa/Hopi (c. 1859–1942)
 Elva Nampeyo, Hopi
 Fannie Nampeyo, Hopi
 Dextra Nampeyo Quotskuyva, Hopi-Tewa
 Nora Naranjo-Morse, Santa Clara Pueblo
 Joy Navasie, Hopi-Tewa (1919–2012)
 Inez Ortiz, Cochiti Pueblo
 Al Qöyawayma, Hopi
 Harlan Reano, Kewa Pueblo (Santo Domingo)
 Ida Redbird, Maricopa/Halchidhoma (possibly also Tohono O'odham) (1892–1971) 
 Jeri Redcorn, Caddo-Potawatomi, (born ca. 1940)
 Diego Romero, Cochiti Pueblo
 Ida Sahmie, Navajo
 Linda and Merton Sisneros, Santa Clara Pueblo
 Anita Suazo, Santa Clara Pueblo (born 1937)
 Roxanne Swentzell, Santa Clara Pueblo
 Margaret Tafoya, (1904–2001) Santa Clara Pueblo
 Sara Fina Tafoya, Kha'po Owingeh (Santa Clara Pueblo), (1863–1949)
 Leonidas Tapia, Ohkay Owingeh Pueblo
 Robert Tenorio, Kewa Pueblo (Santo Domingo) (born 1950)
 Mary Ellen Toya, Jemez Pueblo (1934–1990)
 Faye Tso, Navajo (1933–2004) 
 Lonnie Vigil, Nambé Pueblo
 Nathan Youngblood, Santa Clara Pueblo

Diverse cultural artists

 David Moses Bridges (Passamaquoddy, 1962–2017), birchbark artist, canoe maker
 Nora Thompson Dean (Touching Leaves Woman, Delaware), (1907–1984)
 Ishi, Yahi (ca. 1860–1916), bowmaker and flintknapper
 Vanessa Jennings, Kiowa/Kiowa Apache/Gila River Pima (born 1952)
 Tomah Joseph (Passamaquoddy, 1837–1914), birchbark artist, canoe maker
 Charles Littleleaf, Blackfoot/Warm Springs, flute maker
 Tom Mauchahty-Ware, Kiowa-/Comanche, flute maker
 Scarface Charley, Modoc (ca. 1851–1896), linguist and furniture-maker
 Hastings Shade, Cherokee Nation, marble- and gig-maker
 Tommy Wildcat, Cherokee Nation, flute and rattle maker

Fashion designers
Loren Aragon, Acoma Pueblo
 Ardina Moore (born 1930), Quapaw/Osage
 Lloyd Kiva New (1916–2002), Cherokee Nation
 Bethany Yellowtail (born ~1987) Northern Cheyenne
 Jamie Okuma (born 1977), Luiseño/Shoshone-Bannock
 Virgil Ortiz (born 1969), Cochiti Pueblo

Glass artists
 Marcus Amerman, Choctaw Nation of Oklahoma
 Preston Singletary, Tlingit

Installation and new genres artists

 Natalie Ball (born 1980), Klamath/Modoc
 Sarah Biscarra-Dilley, Northern Chumash 
 Raven Chacon, Navajo Nation, (born 1977)
 Corwin Clairmont, Confederated Salish and Kootenai Tribes of the Flathead Nation
 Gerald Clarke, Cahuilla
 Joe Feddersen, Confederated Tribes of the Colville Reservation (Okanagan) (born 1953)
 Nicholas Galanin, Tlingit/Unangax
 Virgil Ortiz (born 1969), Cochiti Pueblo
 Truman Lowe, Ho-Chunk (1944–2019)
 Cannupa Hanska Luger (born 1979) Mandan/Hidatsa/Arikara/Lakota
 James Luna, Luiseño (1950–2018)
 Bently Spang, Northern Cheyenne, (born 1960)
 Nora Naranjo Morse, Santa Clara Pueblo (born 1953)
 Wendy Red Star, Apsáalooke (Crow) (born 1981)
 Santiago X, Louisiana Coushatta, multidisplinary artist, architect
 Charlene Teters, Spokane (born 1952)
 Marie Watt, Seneca (born 1967)
 Richard Ray Whitman, Yuchi/Muscogee
 Holly Wilson (Delaware Nation/Cherokee, born 1968)

Metalsmiths and jewelers

 Narciso Abeyta, Navajo (1918–1998)
 Keri Ataumbi, Kiowa (born 1971) 
 Klee Benally, Navajo
 Heidi BigKnife, Shawnee (born 1967)
 Gail Bird, Kewa Pueblo-Laguna Pueblo
 Ben Nighthorse Campbell, Cheyenne
 Della Casa Appa, Zuni (1889–1963)
 Yazzie Johnson, Navajo
 Fred Kabotie, Hopi
 Michael Kabotie, Hopi
 Charles Loloma, Hopi
 Atsidi Sani, "Old Smith", Navajo (c. 1828–1918)
 Emory Sekaquaptewa, Hopi
 Sequoyah, Cherokee (c. 1767–1843)
 Tommy Singer, Navajo
 Linda Yamane, Rumsien/Ohlone (born 1949)

Mixed-media artists 
 Melissa Melero-Moose (Northern Paiute/Modoc) mixed-media artist, curator

Painters
 

 Jim Abeita, Navajo (born 1947)
 Narciso Abeyta, Navajo (1918–1998
 Arthur Amiotte, Oglala Lakota
 Avelino Arquero, Cochiti Pueblo
 Tirador Armstrong, Cheyenne/Caddo (1935–2010)
 Spencer Asah (Lallo), Kiowa, one of the Kiowa Six (c. 1905–1954)
 Gilbert Benjamin Atencio, San Ildefonso Pueblo (1930–1995)
 Pat Atencio, San Ildefonso Pueblo (1932–2009)
 Tony Atencio, San Ildefonso Pueblo (1928–1995)
 James Auchiah, Kiowa, one of the Kiowa Six (1906–1974)
 Frank Austin, Navajo (1938–2017)
 Amos Bad Heart Bull (Tatanka Cante Sica), Oglala Lakota Sioux
 Margarete Bagshaw, Santa Clara Pueblo-descent (1964–2015)
 Rick Bartow, Yurok/Wiyot (1946–2016)
 Stanley Battese, Navajo (born 1936)
 Fred Beaver (Eka La Nee), Muscogee Creek/Seminole (1911–1980)
 Clifford Beck, Navajo (1946–1995)
 Timothy Bedah, Navajo (1945–2017)
 Apie Begay, Navajo
 Arthur C. Begay, Navajo (1932–2010)
 Harrison Begay (Haskay Yahne Yah), Navajo (1914/1917–2012)
 Keats Begay, Navajo (1923–1987)
 Black Hawk, Sans Arc Lakota (c. 1832–c. 1890)
 Archie Blackowl (Mistamootova), Southern Cheyenne (1911–1992)
 Acee Blue Eagle (Alex C. McIntosh, Chebon Ahbula), Muscogee Creek
 Roy Boney Jr., Cherokee Nation
 David Bradley, White Earth Ojibwe
 T.C. Cannon (Pai-doung-u-day), Kiowa/Caddo
 Pop Chalee (Merina Lujan), Taos Pueblo (1906–1993)
 Robert Chee, Navajo (1937–1972)
 Jesse Cornplanter, Seneca (1889–1957)
 Woody Crumbo, Citizen Potawatomi (1912–1939)
 David Cusick, Tuscarora (c. 1786–1831), painter and author
 Dennis Cusick, Tuscarora (c. 1800–1824) painter
 Talmadge Davis, Cherokee Nation (1962–2005)
 Frank Day, Bald Rock Konkow Maidu (1902–1976)
 Angel De Cora (Hinook-Mahiwi-Kilinaka), Winnebago (1871–1919)
 Gregg Deal, Pyramid Lake Paiute Tribe
 Jim Denomie, Lac Courte Oreilles Ojibwe (1955-2022)
 Patrick DesJarlait (1923–1973), Red Lake Ojibwe painter
 Cecil Dick (Dagadahga), Cherokee Nation (1915–1992)
 Margaret Dillard, Chickasaw
 Dohasan, Kiowa (ca. 1740s–1866)
 Robert Draper, Navajo (1938–2000)
 Bunky Echo-Hawk, Yakama/Pawnee (born 1975)
 Joseph Erb, Cherokee Nation (born 1974)
 Harry Fonseca, Maidu
 Carl Nelson Gorman (Kin-Ya-Onny-Beyeh), Navajo (1907–1998)
 R.C. Gorman, Navajo (1932–2005)
 Franklin Gritts, Keetoowah Cherokee (1914–1996)
 Enoch Kelly Haney, Seminole/Muscogee (1940–2022)
 Helen Hardin (Tsa-Sah-Wee-Eh), Santa Clara Pueblo (1943–1984)
 Albert Harjo, Muscogee Creek (1937–2019)
 Benjamin Harjo Jr., Absentee Shawnee/Seminole
 Sharron Ahtone Harjo, Kiowa (born 1945)
 Hachivi Edgar Heap of Birds, Southern Cheyenne
 Joan Hill (Cheasequah), Muscogee Creek/Cherokee (1930–2020)
 Jack Hokeah, Kiowa, one of the Kiowa Six (1902–1969)
 Michael Horse, Apache/Yaqui-descent
Lynnette Haozous, Chiricahua Apache, Navajo, and Taos Pueblo
 Allan Houser (Haozous), Chiricahua Apache
 Norma Howard, Choctaw Nation/Chickasaw
 Oscar Howe (Mazuha Hokshina), Yanktonai Dakota
 Howling Wolf, Southern Cheyenne (1849–1927)
 Sharon Irla, Cherokee Nation (born 1957)
 David Johns, Navajo (born 1948)
 Ruthe Blalock Jones (Chu-Lun-Dit), Shawnee/Peoria
 Fred Kabotie (Naqavoy'ma), Hopi (1900–1986)
 Michael Kabotie, Hopi (1942–2009)
 Betty Keener Archuleta, Cherokee Nation (1928-1998)
 Kicking Bear, Oglala Lakota (1846–1904)
 Sylvia Lark, Seneca (1947–1990)
 James Lavadour, Walla Walla
 Annie Little Warrior, also Annie Red Tomahawk, Hunkpapa Lakota (1895–1966)
 Gregory Lomayesva, Hopi-descent
 Judith Lowry, Maidu/Pit River tribes
 Albert Looking Elk, Taos Pueblo (c. 1888–1940)
 Albert Lujan, Taos Pueblo (1892–1948)
 Oren Lyons, Seneca Nation (born 1930)
 Julian Martinez, San Ildefonso Pueblo (1897–1943)
 Mario Martinez, Yaqui (born 1953)
 Solomon McCombs, Muscogee Creek (1913–1980)
 Douglas Miles, San Carlos Apache/Akimel O'odham
 Juan Mirabal, Taos Pueblo (1903–1970)
 Isabel Montoya, San Ildefonso Pueblo (1899–1996)
 Stephen Mopope (Qued Koi), Kiowa, one of the Kiowa Six (1898–1974)
 George Morrison, Ojibwe (1919–2000)
 Naiche, Chiricahua Apache (c. 1857–1919)
 Gerald Nailor, Sr. (Toh Yah, "Walking by the River"), Navajo
 Dan Namingha, Hopi
 Jackson Narcomey, Muscogee Creek/Seminole, (1942–2012)
 Doc Tate Nevaquaya (Comanche Nation, 1932–1996)
 Lloyd Kiva New, Cherokee Nation, (1916–2002)
 Diane O'Leary, Comanche, (1939–2013)
 Fernando Padilla, Jr., San Felipe Pueblo/Navajo
 Tonita Peña, (Quah Ah) San Ildefonso Pueblo (1893–1949)
 St. David Pendleton Oakerhater (Making Medicine), Southern Cheyenne, (c. 1847–1931)
 Oqwa Pi, (Abel Sanchez, Red Cloud), San Ildefonso Pueblo (1899–1971)
 Sanford Plummer, Seneca (1905–1974)
 Harvey Pratt (Wo-Pet-No-No-Mot, White Thunder), Cheyenne-Arapaho
 Joseph Rael (Tslew-teh-koyeh "Beautiful Painted Arrow), Picuris Pueblo/Ute
 Kevin Red Star, Crow Nation
 Mateo Romero, Cochiti Pueblo
 Paladine Roye (Pon Cee Cee), Ponca (1946–2001)
 Will Sampson, Muscogee Creek (1933–1987)
 Percy Tsisete Sandy (Kai-Sa "Red Moon"), Zuni Pueblo, (1918-1974)
 Duane Slick, Mesqwaki/Fox/Ho-Chunk (born 1961)
 Fritz Scholder, Luiseño (1937–2005)
 Silver Horn (Haungooah) Kiowa (1860–1940)
 Jaune Quick-To-See Smith, Salish-Kootenai/Métis/Cree, Shoshone/Bannock
 Lois Smoky Kaulaity (Bougetah), Kiowa, one of the Kiowa Six (1907–1981)
 Ernest Spybuck (Maythela), Absentee Shawnee (1883–1949)
 Virginia Stroud, Keetoowah Cherokee/Muscogee
 Carl Sweezy, Southern Arapaho (1881–1953)
 Moses Stranger Horse, Brulé Lakota (1890–1941)
 Quincy Tahoma aka Water's Edge, Navajo (1920–1956)
 Tichkematse, (Cheyenne and Arapaho Tribes) (1857-1932)
 Jerome Tiger (Kocha), Muscogee Creek/Seminole
 Johnny Tiger, Jr., Muscogee Creek/Seminole (1940–2015)
 Monroe Tsatoke, Kiowa, one of the Kiowa Six (1904–1937)
 Awa Tsireh (Alfonso Roybal), San Ildefonso Pueblo (1898–1955)
 Frank Tuttle, Yuki, Wailaki and Concow Maidu (born 1951)
 Pablita Velarde (Tse Tsan), Santa Clara Pueblo (1918–2006)
 Kay WalkingStick, Cherokee Nation
 Pop Wea (Lori Tanner), Taos Pueblo (died 1966)
 Dick West (Wah-pah-nah-yah), Southern Cheyenne (1912–1996)
 White Horse (Tsen-tainte), Kiowa (died 1892)
 Dyani White Hawk, Sicangu Lakota (born 1976)
 Emmi Whitehorse, Navajo
 Elizabeth Woody, Navajo/Tenino (Warm Springs)/Wasco/Yakama (born 1959)
 Beatien Yazz, Navajo
 Melanie Yazzie, Navajo

Performance artists

 Marcus Amerman, Choctaw Nation of Oklahoma
 Gregg Deal, Pyramid Lake Paiute
 James Luna, Luiseño (1950–2018)
 Rosy Simas, Seneca Nation of Indians, Heron clan

Photographers

 Dugan Aguilar, Paiute-Pit River-Maidu (1947–2018)
 Jennie Ross Cobb, Cherokee (1881–1959)
 Jean Fredericks, Hopi (1906–1990)
 Shan Goshorn, Eastern Band Cherokee (1957–2018)
 Benjamin Haldane, Tsimshian (1874–1941)
 Sally Larsen, Apache-Alutiiq
 L. Frank Manriquez, Tongva-Ajachmen
 Lee Marmon, Laguna Pueblo (1925–2021)
 Parker McKenzie, Kiowa (1897–1999)
 Larry McNeil, Tlingit-Nisga'a (born 1955)
 Shelley Niro, Mohawk (born 1954)
 Horace Poolaw, Kiowa (1906–1984)
 Camille Seaman, Shinnecock (born 1969)
 Richard Throssel (1882–1933), Cree
 Hulleah Tsinhnahjinnie, Muscogee Creek-Seminole-Navajo (born 1954)
 Richard Ray Whitman, Yuchi-Muscogee Creek
 Will Wilson, Navajo, (born 1969)
 Zoë Marieh Urness (photographer) Alaska Tlingit (born 1984)

Printmakers

 Natalie Ball, Klamath/Modoc, (born 1980)
 T.C. Cannon (Pai-doung-u-day), Kiowa/Caddo
 R.C. Gorman, Navajo (1932–2005)
 Benjamin Harjo Jr., Absentee Shawnee-Seminole Tribe of Oklahoma
 Hachivi Edgar Heap of Birds, Cheyenne-Arapaho
 Debora Iyall, Cowlitz (born 1954)
 Frank LaPena, Nomtipom-Wintu (1937–2019), printmaker, painter, woodworker
 James Lavadour, Walla Walla
 Linda Lomahaftewa, Hopi-Choctaw Nation of Oklahoma
 Jaune Quick-To-See Smith, Salish-Kootenai, Métis-Cree, Shoshone-Bannock
 Melanie Yazzie, Navajo

Sculptors

 Rick Bartow, Wiyot/Yurok (1946–2016)
 Blackbear Bosin, Comanche/Kiowa (1921–1980)
 Amanda Crowe, Eastern Band Cherokee (1928–2004)
 Cliff Fragua, Jemez Pueblo
 Tammy Garcia, Santa Clara Pueblo (born 1969)
 Bob Haozous, Chiricahua Apache (born 1943)
 Allan Houser (Haozous), Chiricahua Apache (1914–1994)
 Nathan Jackson, Tlingit (born 1938)
 Edmonia Lewis, Mississauga Ojibwe (c. 1844–1907)
 Nora Naranjo Morse, Santa Clara Pueblo (born 1953)
 Harvey Pratt (Wo-Pet-No-No-Mot, "White Thunder"), Cheyenne and Arapaho Tribes (born 1941)
 Lawney Reyes, Sinixt
 Ronald Senungetuk, Iñupiaq (1933–2020)
 Russell Spears, Narragansett (1917–2009)
 Roxanne Swentzell, Santa Clara Pueblo (born 1962)
 Ralph W. Sturges, Mohegan (1918–2007)
 Marie Watt, Seneca (born 1967)
 Holly Wilson (Delaware Nation/Cherokee, born 1968)
 Melanie Yazzie, Navajo (born 1966)

Textile artists

 Natalie Ball, Klamath/Modoc, (born 1980)
 D.Y. Begay, Navajo (born 1953)
 Hastiin Klah, Navajo (1867–1937)
 Lily Hope, Tlingit (born 1983)
 Ursala Hudson, Tlingit
 Carla Hemlock, Mohawk (born 1961)
 Ardina Moore, Quapaw/Osage (1930–2022)
 Dora Old Elk, Apsáalooke/Sioux (born 1977)
 Jamie Okuma, Luiseño/Shoshone-Bannock (born 1977)
 Eric-Paul Riege, Navajo (born 1994)
 Clarissa Rizal, Tlingit (1956–2016)
 Clara Sherman (Nezbah), Navajo (1914–2010)
 Adele Sigguk, Inuk (born 1961)
 Ska-ba-quay Tesson, Meskwaki (ca. 1846–1929)
 Jennie Thlunaut, Tlingit (1892–1986)

Woodcarvers

 Amanda Crowe, Eastern Band Cherokee (1928–2004)
 Jesse Cornplanter, Seneca (1889–1957)
 Babe Hemlock, Mohawk (born 1961)
 Nathan Jackson, Tlingit (born 1938)
 Jewell James (Praying Wolf, Tse Sealth), Lummi (born 1953)
 James Schoppert, Tlingit (1947–1992)

See also 

 Native American art
 Timeline of Native American art history
 List of Native American women artists
 List of indigenous artists of the Americas
 List of Native American artists from Oklahoma
 Native Americans in the United States
 Native American women in the arts
 List of writers from peoples indigenous to the Americas
 Native American basketry
 Native American pottery

Notes

References
 Lester, Patrick D. The Biographical Directory of Native American Painters. Norman: University of Oklahoma Press, 1995. .

External links

 National Museum of the American Indian
 Indian Arts and Crafts Association

 
Artists
Lists of artists
Lists of artists by nationality
Lists of American artists